The Cauayan City National High School is a public educational institution established in Cauayan, Isabela, Philippines. It was established on June 3, 1997, as an extension of Cauayan Polytechnic College, now Isabela State University-Cauayan Campus.

It was formerly named as Cauayan National High School since its inception and later renamed to its present name when Cauayan, Isabela became a city on March 30, 2001. In 2013, Cauayan City National High School won as the greenest school in the Philippines.

Administration 
The school is now administered by DepEd Schools Division of Cauayan. Ms./Mrs. Maribeth Dela Peña, Secondary School Principal II serves as the newly assigned secondary school principal of Cauayan City National High School.

Education programs 
Cauayan City National High School has educational programs for students for the following curriculum
 Science, Technology, and Engineering Curriculum (STE)
 Special Program in Arts (SPA)
 Special Program in Sports (SPS)
 Special Program in Journalism (SPJ)
 Special Program in Foreign Language (SPFL)
Basic Education Curriculum (BEC)

The school is currently implementing Grades 7 to 10 in accordance with the K to 12 program of the Department of Education.

References

External links 

Schools in Isabela (province)
1997 establishments in the Philippines